Tabriz Cycling Track is a 250 m long concrete track in Tabriz, Iran. The cycling track is next to the Sahand Stadium and is part of Tabriz Olympic village project. It was officially opened in February 2011.

References

Sports venues in Tabriz
Velodromes in Iran
Sports venues in Iran
Sports venues completed in 2011
Cycling in Iran
2011 establishments in Iran